Pranil L Timalsena (Nepali: प्रनिल तिमल्सिना) is a Nepali singer and rapper.

Girish-Pranil
He started his musical career with Girish Khatiwada (NepHop) as the duo "GP-GirishPranil" in the 1990s. Their first song was Ma Yesto Chhu with rapper DA69, which was the first major success of hiphop music in Nepal. It laid the foundation of Nepalese hiphop music. Girish-Pranil made other songs like Timi Jaha Pani Jaanchhau, Malai Bhot Deu, Hami Dherai Sana Chhu, Meaningless Rap. Their other songs are Diyeko Maya Samhali, Dream, Gaarho Bho, Intro, Zoom Zoom Boom Boom, Seto Ghoda, Yesari, and Track 13.

Other Collaboration Hits
He made a song Aankha Bhari featuring rapper DA69 which was a hit in Nepal. He also made a feature to Nabin K Bhattarai on his most Super Hit Composition Yehi Ho Ta Maya.

Solo songs
His other songs are:
 Ajiyo Mutu
 Bhanchhu
 Aashu yo jharcha
 Eklo yatra
 Sabai Naacha Chan
 Maya yo timilai

References

Year of birth missing (living people)
Living people
21st-century Nepalese male singers
Nepalese hip hop singers